Xu Xianghua (born May 1965) is a major general in the People's Liberation Army (PLA) of China. In August 2019 he has been placed under investigation by the PLA's anti-corruption agency. Previously he served as deputy commander of Western Theater Command Ground Force.

Early life
Xu was born in Hai'an County, Jiangsu, in May 1965.

Career
He attained the rank of major general in December 2014. In April 2017 he was commissioned as army commander of the 74th Group Army. In October 2018 he was appointed deputy commander of Western Theater Command Ground Force.

He was a delegate to the 13th National People's Congress.

Investigation
In August 2019, Xu was placed under investigation by the PLA's anti-corruption agency. Xu was ordered to resign as representative of the 13th National People's Congress.

References

1965 births
People from Hai'an
Living people
Delegates to the 13th National People's Congress
People's Liberation Army generals from Jiangsu